The Nant de Drance Hydropower Plant is a pumped-storage power station in the canton of Valais in Switzerland. Construction on the power plant began in 2008 and it began operations in 2022. The US$1.9 billion plant has installed capacity of 900 MW and an energy storage capacity of 20 GWh.

Background

On 25 August 2008, the Swiss Federal Department of Environment, Transport, Energy and Communications granted a building permit to Nant de Drance SA for the construction of the plant with a 600 MW design. Preliminary construction began in September 2008 but a concession was granted in April 2011 which allowed for a larger 900 MW plant. Excavation of the tunnels began in 2009 and the caverns commenced in 2010. Raising of the upper Vieux Emosson Dam began in Spring 2013 and should be done by the end of 2015. The underground power house excavation was complete in April 2014. The first generators should be tested in 2017 with all six commissioned between 2018 and 2021.

In December 2014, at the International Tunnelling & Underground Space Awards, the project was awarded the Major Tunnelling Project of the Year award in the category of projects over US$500 million.

Design

The power plant use two existing reservoirs to operate.

The power plant will lie in-between both reservoirs and use the pumped-storage hydroelectric method. To accomplish this, when energy demand is high, water will be released from the upper reservoir, down a series of  penstocks to the six 150 MW reversible Francis turbine-generators in the power plant. After generating power, water from the power plant is discharged to the lower reservoir, releasing up to 20 GWh of energy. When power demand is low, such as at night, the turbines reverse and water can be pumped back up to the upper reservoir for use during high demand periods. As such, it serves as a peaking power plant with 80% efficiency.

Under the guidance of AF-Consult Switzerland Ltd as general planner, the civil engineering works were carried out by GMI (a joint venture of Marti and Implenia) and the electro-mechanical works are being undertaken by GE Hydro.

References

Hydroelectric power stations in Switzerland
Pumped-storage hydroelectric power stations in Switzerland
Buildings and structures in Valais
Dams in Switzerland
Arch dams
Underground power stations
Energy infrastructure under construction